10P/Tempel, also known as Tempel 2, is a periodic Jupiter-family comet with a 5 year orbital period. It was discovered on July 4, 1873 by Wilhelm Tempel. The next perihelion passage is 24 March 2021 when the comet will have a solar elongation of 30 degrees at approximately apparent magnitude 11.

The comet nucleus is estimated to be roughly the size of Halley's Comet at 10.6 kilometers in diameter with a low albedo of 0.022. The nucleus is dark because hydrocarbons on the surface have been converted to a dark, tar like substance by solar ultraviolet radiation. The nucleus is large enough that even near aphelion (furthest distance from the Sun which is near the orbit of Jupiter) the comet remains brighter than about magnitude 21.

During the 2010 apparition the comet brightened to about apparent magnitude 8. The most favorable apparition of 10P/Tempel 2 was in 1925 when it came within  of Earth with an apparent magnitude of 6.5.

Proposed exploration

The Jet Propulsion Laboratory proposed a flyby of the comet with a flight spare of Mariner 4. The probe was instead used for a venus flyby as Mariner 5.

References

External links 
 Orbital simulation from JPL (Java) / Horizons Ephemeris
 Elements and Ephemeris for 10P/Tempel – Minor Planet Center
 10P/Tempel 2 / 2010 – Seiichi Yoshida @ aerith.net
 10P/Tempel 2 (2010) (astrosurf)

Periodic comets
0010
Comets in 2015
20210324
18730704